Nissolia, the yellowhoods, is a genus of lianas in the legume family, Fabaceae. It belongs to the subfamily Faboideae, and was recently assigned to the informal monophyletic Adesmia clade of the Dalbergieae.

References

Dalbergieae
Fabaceae genera